Overton Rural District was formed by the Local Government Act 1894 which created numerous administrative areas around the country. The district was located in an exclave of Flintshire known as English Maelor, surrounded by Cheshire, Denbighshire and Shropshire. 

It consisted of eleven civil parishes:
Bangor on Dee
Bettisfield
Bronington
Halghton
Hanmer
Iscoyd
Overton
Penley
Tybroughton
Willington
Worthenbury

Overton Rural District was renamed Maelor Rural District in 1953.

References

History of Flintshire